Gol-e-Sorkh is a square in Shiraz, Iran. A square near the Shiraz International Airport. It was originally famous for being filled with red roses (Gol-e-Sorkh).

It is now the starting place of the Shiraz Metro line.

Buildings and structures in Shiraz
Squares in Iran